The racial and ethnic history of New York City has varied widely; from its sale to the Dutch by Native American residents, to the modern multi-cultural period.

New York City has had a largely white population, and most foreign born immigrants to the city before the end of World War II were from Europe. However, this changed in the decades after World War II, when all of the boroughs became  more  diverse, and when immigration from places outside Europe was increased largely due to the Immigration and Nationality Act of 1965.

Overview
The population of New York City was over 90% Non-Hispanic White until the post-World War II era. Large numbers of colored, Hispanics, or Asians  began settling in Manhattan in the 1920s and in the rest of NYC after World War II. The slowest area in the city to change its racial makeup was Staten Island, which was the only borough of New York City to retain a Non-Hispanic White majority after the 1980s. Between 1900 and 2010, New York City's total Black population increased by about thirty-five times, while its Asian population increased by over one-hundred-and-fifty times over the same period. The large Black migration to New York City helped cause the Harlem Renaissance, a rich cultural period for the African Americans living in New York (especially in Harlem neighborhood, the namesake) between the end of World War I and the Great Depression. New York's Hispanic population increased by almost twenty times between 1940 and 2010, while its total Non-Hispanic White population decreased by over 60% over the same time period.

New York's five boroughs have had different settlement histories.  The Bronx and Brooklyn were the most popular destinations for Blacks to settle, while Queens was the most popular destination for Asian migrants to NYC and the Bronx was the most popular destination for Hispanic migrants to move to. New York City's total population more than doubled between 1900 and 2010 (with a period of population stagnation between 1950 and 1990). The Bronx, Queens, and Staten Island experienced enormous population growth between 1900 and 2010, much higher than New York's average population growth. Brooklyn's population grew at a much slower rate during this time period, while Manhattan actually had fewer people in 2010 than in 1900.

New York City has always had a much greater percentage of immigrants as part of its total population than the whole United States has. Right before World War I over 40% of New York City's total population was composed of immigrants. After immigration restrictions were passed in the 1920s, immigrants as a percentage of New York's total population dropped to 18% in 1970, before bouncing back up to 36% in 2000. The recorded increase in the city's immigrant percentage after 1970 occurred after the passage of the Immigration Act of 1965 (which took effect in 1968) and at a time when a greater number of immigrants than before were coming to the United States. Most of the earlier immigrants to New York City were from Europe (initially from Western Europe, and then more from Eastern Europe). A large percentage of the immigrants that came to New York City after 1965 were from non-European countries. Large numbers of Irish people arrived in New York City during the Great Famine in the 1840s, while Germans, Italians, Jews, and other European ethnic groups arrived in NYC mostly during the late 19th and early 20th centuries. Because of the abolition of the National Origins Formula, a large percentage of the immigrants that came to New York City after 1965 were from non-European countries. Of the immigrants in the state, about three million live in New York City.  The number of immigrants living in New York City increased only slightly from 2000 to 2011, with an increase from 2,871,032 to 3,066,599 residents being born outside the United States.

Citywide 
Ethnic Make-up of New York City

The following tables present a consolidated demographic profile of race and ethnicity in New York City which includes all five boroughs.

 Foreign-born population data from 2020 Census not yet available (as of Sept 2021).

By borough

The Bronx

Brooklyn

Manhattan

Queens

Staten Island

See also
 Demographics of New York City

References

Cultural history of New York City
New York
Demographics of New York City
Ethnic groups in New York City